Ronald Clayton (5 August 1934 – 29 October 2010) was an English footballer who made nearly 600 appearances in the Football League playing for Blackburn Rovers. He was capped 35 times for England between 1955 and 1960.

Clayton, a right half, began his career with Blackburn Rovers (where his elder brother Ken was also a squad member). He made his first-team debut as a 16-year-old in the 1950–51 season, and between then and 1969 made 581 appearances for his only Football League club. He then became player-manager of Morecambe, and also appeared for Great Harwood before retiring.

At international level, Clayton was capped six times for England under-23, once for England B, and 35 times at full international level, including five as captain. He made his international debut against Northern Ireland in November 1955, and won his last cap against Yugoslavia in May 1960. He was part of England's team at the 1958 FIFA World Cup. Clayton died in October 2010.

On 13 August 2011, as a sign of respect to Clayton, it was announced at half-time during the first game of the 2011–12 Barclays Premier League season, that The Blackburn End was to be renamed The Ronnie Clayton End at Ewood Park. 
In February 2019 he was one of the first seven players to be inducted into the club's Hall of Fame.

See also
 List of England national football team captains 
 List of English association football families 
 List of footballers in England by number of league appearances (500+)
 List of one-club men in association football

References

External links
 
 

1934 births
2010 deaths
Footballers from Preston, Lancashire
English footballers
England international footballers
England B international footballers
England under-23 international footballers
Association football midfielders
Blackburn Rovers F.C. players
Morecambe F.C. players
English Football League players
1958 FIFA World Cup players
English football managers
Morecambe F.C. managers
Great Harwood F.C. players
English Football League representative players
FA Cup Final players